Tarabnameh is a long musical mazhake by Bahram Beyzai, in which multiple stories are interwoven together in a historical setting. It was written in 1994 and brought to stage in 2016 in two parts. The premiere for the first part was on March 26, 2016 at De Anza College in Cupertino, California.

Cast
 Mojdeh Shamsaie
 Hamid Ehya
 Matin Nasiriha

References

2016 plays
Plays by Bahram Beyzai
Stage productions by Bahram Beyzai